Hòa Hiệp may refer to:
 Commune Hòa Hiệp, Đắk Lắk, Cư Kuin District, Đắk Lắk Province
 Commune Hòa Hiệp, Tây Ninh, Tân Biên District, Tây Ninh Province
 Commune Hòa Hiệp, Bà Rịa–Vũng Tàu, Xuyên Mộc District, Bà Rịa–Vũng Tàu Province.